Nonaprenyl diphosphate synthase may refer to:
All-trans-nonaprenyl-diphosphate synthase (geranyl-diphosphate specific), enzyme
All-trans-nonaprenyl diphosphate synthase (geranylgeranyl-diphosphate specific), enzyme